Warren is an unincorporated community and census-designated place in Columbia County, Oregon, United States, located on U.S. Route 30 north of Scappoose and south of St. Helens on Scappoose Bay of the Multnomah Channel. As of the 2010 census it had a population of 1,787.

The Warren post office was established in 1885; it was named by local resident James Gill for his hometown of Warren, Massachusetts. The post office was discontinued in 1888, but reestablished in 1890 as "Gilltown" because there was another post office named Warren in Umatilla County. The Columbia County office became Warren again in 1895, and the Umatilla County office was closed in 1902; the locality in Umatilla County is now known as Myrick.

Demographics

Climate
This region experiences warm (but not hot) and dry summers, with no average monthly temperatures above .  According to the Köppen Climate Classification system, Warren has a warm-summer Mediterranean climate, abbreviated "Csb" on climate maps.

References

Populated places established in 1885
Unincorporated communities in Columbia County, Oregon
Census-designated places in Oregon
1885 establishments in Oregon
Census-designated places in Columbia County, Oregon
Oregon populated places on the Columbia River
Unincorporated communities in Oregon